The 1913 Primera División was the second season of top-flight Peruvian football. 8 teams competed in the league, The champion was Jorge Chávez N°1.

League table

Standings

Title

External links
Peruvian Championship 
Peruvian Football League News 
La Liga Peruana de Football 

Peru
1913
1913 in Peruvian football